Sarah Michelle Prinze (born April 14, 1977) is an American actress. After being spotted at the age of four in New York City, she made her screen acting debut in the television film An Invasion of Privacy (1983). A leading role on the teen drama series Swans Crossing (1992) was followed by her breakthrough as Kendall Hart on the ABC daytime soap opera All My Children (1993–1995), for which she won the Daytime Emmy Award for Outstanding Younger Actress in a Drama Series.

Gellar received international recognition for her portrayal of Buffy Summers on the WB/UPN television series Buffy the Vampire Slayer (1997–2003), which earned her five Teen Choice Awards, a Saturn Award, and a Golden Globe Award nomination. Her film credits include I Know What You Did Last Summer (1997), Scream 2 (1997), Cruel Intentions (1999), Scooby-Doo (2002), Scooby-Doo 2: Monsters Unleashed (2004), The Grudge (2004), and Southland Tales (2006).

On television, Gellar has headlined the CW's Ringer (2011–2012), CBS's The Crazy Ones (2013–2014), and Paramount+'s Wolf Pack (since 2023). She has also provided her voice for Adult Swim's Robot Chicken (2005–2018) and Netflix's Masters of the Universe: Revelation (2021). In 2015, Gellar co-founded Foodstirs, an e-commerce startup selling baking kits, and in 2017, she released her own cookbook, Stirring Up Fun with Food.

Early life
Gellar was born in Long Island, New York on April 14, 1977. She is the only child of Rosellen (née Greenfield), a nursery school teacher, and Arthur Gellar, a garment worker. Both of her parents are Jewish, though Gellar's family also had a Christmas tree during her childhood. In 1984, when she was seven, her parents divorced and she was raised by her mother on Manhattan's Upper East Side. While growing up with her mother, she lost contact with her father, from whom she remained estranged until his death in 2001; she once described him as "non-existent", and in a 2002 interview, she stated: "My father, you can just say, is not in the picture. I'm not being deliberately evasive about him, it's just that there's so little to say." Besides being a working child at the time, Gellar was a competitive figure skater, once finishing in third place at a New York State regional competition, as well as having a black belt in taekwondo.

Gellar was given a partial scholarship to study at the Columbia Grammar & Preparatory School, which she attended until the eighth grade.  She said in an interview with The Independent: "I was different and that's the one thing you can't be at school, because you're ostracised. I didn't have the money these kids had". Gellar was not present in class for most of the time at the school as she had to work in several acting projects simultaneously, recalling that she "had more absences in the first month than you're supposed to have for an entire year. I was telling them that I had back problems and had to go to the doctor the whole time". Gellar then briefly attended the Fiorello H. LaGuardia High School of Music & Art and Performing Arts, but dropped out due to acting obligations; the teachers threatened to fail her because of her constant absence from classes as she was busy going to auditions, despite earning good grades. Gellar graduated from the Professional Children's School in 1994 as a "straight A" student with a 4.0 grade average. As Gellar spent significant time working on All My Children while "trying to graduate", the majority of her senior year was completed through guided study.

Career

1980s
At the age of four, Gellar was spotted by an agent in a restaurant in Upper Manhattan. Two weeks later, she auditioned for a part in the television film An Invasion of Privacy. At the audition, she read both her own lines and those of Valerie Harper, impressing the directors enough to cast her in the role. The film aired on CBS in January 1983.

Gellar subsequently appeared in a series of television commercials for Burger King, including one that proved controversial, in which she criticized McDonald's and claimed to eat only at Burger King. The ad led to a lawsuit by McDonald's, naming Gellar and banning her from eating at the food chain; she recalled in a 2004 interview: "I wasn't allowed to eat there. It was tough because, when you're a little kid, McDonald's is where all your friends have their birthday parties, so I missed out on a lot of apple pies." While growing up, Gellar also worked as a model for Wilhelmina and acted in numerous television commercials.

During the 1980s, Gellar played minor roles in the films Over the Brooklyn Bridge (1984), Funny Farm (1988) and High Stakes (1989), and guest starred in various television series, such as Spenser: For Hire and Crossbow. She appeared in a safety skit during the November 11, 1985 episode of  Late Night with David Letterman. At the age of nine, she acted in the off-Broadway production The Widow Claire, as well as in the Kids Klassics Sing Along videos Camp Melody and USS Songboat. In 1989, she served briefly as a co-host of the syndicated teen talk show Girl Talk.

1990s 
Gellar portrayed 13-year-old Mollie in the initial production of Neil Simon's play Jake's Women, which ran at the Old Globe Theatre in San Diego, California, from March to April 1990. In 1991, she was cast as a young Jacqueline Bouvier in A Woman Named Jackie. The miniseries won the Emmy Award for Outstanding Limited Series. Gellar next took on the leading role in the 1992 syndicated teen serial Swans Crossing, which chronicled the lives of a group of wealthy teenagers. The series ran for a 65-episode season and earned her two Young Artist Award nominations for Best Young Actress.

Gellar made her debut on the ABC soap opera All My Children in 1993, playing Kendall Hart, the long-lost teenage daughter of character Erica Kane (Susan Lucci). As she got the role, Gellar was complimented as having the acting talent and the "forceful personality" needed to go up against Lucci's experience; Kendall was supposed to be like a younger version of Erica. Her stint on the show was successful as "longtime fans of the soap saw her as the second coming of Erica". Writers showcased her more after her initial reception and she became a household name to the soap opera medium. In 1995, at the age of eighteen, she won a Daytime Emmy Award for Outstanding Younger Actress in a Drama Series for the role. The same year, Gellar left the show to pursue other acting opportunities.

Gellar moved to Los Angeles following her departure from All My Children, and in 1996, she read the script for Joss Whedon's television series Buffy the Vampire Slayer, which follows Buffy Summers, a teenager burdened with the responsibility of fighting occult foes and supernatural occurrences. She screen tested several times originally for the role of Cordelia Chase, but after approaching Whedon and producers about playing Buffy Summers, she auditioned again and was eventually cast in the title role. The show premiered in March 1997, to widespread critical and popular acclaim. Gellar's Buffy, created to subvert the stereotypical female horror movie victim, was described by Entertainment Weekly as one of the 100 greatest female characters in U.S. television. Buffy ran for seven seasons and 144 episodes, and during its broadcast, earned Gellar five Teen Choice Awards, the Saturn Award for Best Genre Television Actress and a Golden Globe Award nomination for Best Actress – Television Series Drama. She sang during the series' musical episode "Once More, with Feeling", which spawned an original cast album, released in 2002.

During the early airing of Buffy the Vampire Slayer, Gellar made her first major film appearances in two successful slasher films. In  I Know What You Did Last Summer (1997), she took on the role of ill-fated aspiring actress Helen Shivers. Washington Post found the cast to be "solid", in what San Francisco Chronicle described as a "competent but uninspired" film. Budgeted at US$17million, the film made US$125million globally. For her part, Gellar earned a Blockbuster Entertainment Award for Favorite Supporting Actress – Horror and a MTV Movie Award nomination for Best Breakthrough Performance. In Scream 2 (1997), Gellar played a likewise ill-fated vain character, this time that of a Sorority sister. She filmed her scenes in between shots of Buffy and had only recently finished work on I Know What You Did Last Summer. Despite the hectic scheduling, she agreed to perform in Scream 2 without having read the script, on the basis of the success of the first film. Scream 2 grossed over US$172million worldwide.

In 1998, Gellar hosted for the first time Saturday Night Live, and provided the voice of the Gwendy Doll in Small Soldiers. In 1999, she had a cameo appearance in the sleeper hit She's All That, and took on the lead role of a struggling restaurant owner in the romantic comedy Simply Irresistible. Gellar once called it a "bad choice", but Roger Ebert found her to be "lovely" in what he described as an "old-fashioned" comedy. In Roger Kumble's Cruel Intentions (1999), a modern-day retelling of Les Liaisons dangereuses, Gellar played Kathryn Merteuil, a brunette cocaine addict with an appetite for manipulating people. In his review for the film, Ebert felt that she is "effective as a bright girl who knows exactly how to use her act as a tramp", and in an interview with Chicago Tribune, Kumble described her as "the most professional actor I ever worked with". The film was a hit at the box office, grossing US$75million worldwide. Gellar and co-star Selma Blair obtained the Best Kiss award at the 2000 MTV Movie Awards. In Angel, a spin-off series of Buffy the Vampire Slayer, Gellar reprised her titular role for a three-episode arc, starting in 1999.

2000s 
In 2000, Gellar appeared as a film studio executive in the HBO series Sex and the City episode "Escape from New York". Her next film, James Toback's independent drama Harvard Man (2001), in which she starred as the "sharp and shrewd" daughter of a mobster, helped her shed her good girl image, along with Cruel Intentions, according to Peter Travers of Rolling Stone. In 2002, Gellar portrayed Daphne Blake in the live action–comedy Scooby-Doo. For the production, she trained with a Hong Kong wire team, and commuted between Queensland and California every two weeks due to her simultaneous commitment to Buffy. Despite negative reviews, A. O. Scott of The New York Times felt that her performance added "a snarl of Powerpuff feminism to her character's ditzy stereotype", and with a global gross of US$275million, Scooby-Doo emerged as Gellar's most widely seen film to date. Her role earned her the Teen Choice Award for Choice Movie Actress – Comedy. With  Jack Black, she hosted the 2002 MTV Movie Awards, which attracted 7.1million viewers on its June 6 broadcast, achieving the show's highest rating ever at the time.

During her growing film career, Gellar continued to work on Buffy the Vampire Slayer, but she decided to leave the series after the seventh season. When asked why, she explained, "This isn't about leaving for a career in movies, or in theater –it's more of a personal decision. I need a rest." In her feature in Esquire magazine, Gellar expressed her pride for her work on Buffy, "I truly believe that it is one of the greatest shows of all time and it will go down in history as that. And I don't feel that that is a cocky statement. We changed the way that people looked at television."

After the end of Buffy the Vampire Slayer, Gellar reprised the role of Daphne in Scooby-Doo 2: Monsters Unleashed (2004). Like the first film, Scooby-Doo 2 was a commercial success despite a negative critical response. In Takashi Shimizu's The Grudge (2004), she portrayed  Karen Davis, an exchange student in Tokyo who becomes exposed to a supernatural curse. The film received mixed reviews from critics, but was a major box office hit, grossing more than US$110million in North America and US$187million globally. She received a MTV Movie Award nomination for Best Frightened Performance as well as a Teen Choice Award nomination for Choice Movie Actress – Thriller. Gellar provided her voice for the character Gina Vendetti in The Simpsons episode "The Wandering Juvie", which aired in March 2004, and went on to voice several recurring characters of the animated television series Robot Chicken, starting in 2005.

Gellar starred in Richard Kelly's Southland Tales (2006) as a psychic adult film star who creates a reality television series based on prophetic visions. Drawn to the "batshit ambitious" ideas for the film, she accepted the role before she even read the script. Southland Tales polarised critics upon its debut at the 2006 Cannes Film Festival and found a limited audience in theaters. However, J. Hoberman for Village Voice remarked that the director contrived a "memorable" comic performance from Gellar, while the film gathered a cult following in subsequent years. In 2006, Gellar briefly reprised the role of Karen in the sequel The Grudge 2, and starred in Asif Kapadia's psychological thriller The Return, as a businesswoman haunted by memories of her childhood and the mysterious death of a young woman. The Return was a critical and commercial failure, grossing only US$11million. Jeannette Catsoulis of The New York Times called it a "career stagnation".

In 2007, Gellar voiced Ella and April O'Neil in Happily N'Ever After and TMNT, respectively. She starred in the romantic comedy Suburban Girl and the drama The Air I Breathe, both of which were screened at the 2007 Tribeca Film Festival and released in January 2008. In Suburban Girl, she took on the role of a New York City editor and the love interest of a much older businessman (Alec Baldwin). In The Air I Breathe, Gellar portrayed an up-and-coming pop singer. The New York Times described the latter as a "gangster movie with delusions of grandeur", while DVD Talk noted that "her character here has the deepest emotional arc, and she hits all the right notes."

The psychological thriller Possession, in which Gellar starred as a lawyer whose life is thrown into chaos after a car accident sends her husband and brother-in-law into comas, had a range of release dates in the United States between 2008 and 2009, due to financial problems at Yari Film Group. The film ultimately went to DVD in March 2010. In  Veronika Decides to Die, Gellar starred as a young depressed woman who rediscovers the joy in life when she finds out that she only has days to live following a suicide attempt. Following theatrical runs abroad, the film was released domestically through VOD in January 2015. Frank Scheck of The Hollywood Reporter found the actress to be "reasonably compelling" in what he called a "ponderous and silly misfire".

2010s
Gellar took a two-year hiatus from acting following the birth of her daughter in 2009, and in 2011, she signed to star and work as executive producer for The CW's Ringer, in which she played the dual role of twin sisters, one of whom is on the run and manages to hide by assuming the wealthy life of the other. Gellar has stated that part of her decision to return to a television series was because it allowed her to both work and raise her child. The series received moderately positive reviews from critics, and went on to have a large fan base, but it was canceled after the first season. For her portrayal, she received several award nominations, including one for the Teen Choice Award for Choice Television Actress – Drama.

In September 2011, Gellar returned as a guest star on All My Children before the show's ending but not as Kendall Hart; she portrayed a patient at Pine Valley Hospital who tells Maria Santos that she is "Erica Kane's daughter", and states that she saw vampires before they became trendy—a reference to Buffy the Vampire Slayer. She voiced a character in the American Dad! episode "Virtual In-Stanity", and again for the December 6, 2012, episode ("Adventures in Hayleysitting"). On September 30, 2012, she reprised her role of Gina Vendetti in the premiere episode of The Simpsons''' season 24.

A fan of Robin Williams for years, once Gellar learned that he was making the CBS single-camera sitcom  The Crazy Ones (2013–2014), she contacted her friend Sarah de Sa Rego, the wife of Williams' best friend, Bobcat Goldthwait, in order to lobby for a co-starring role. She obtained the part of an advertising director who runs an agency with her father. Digital Spy felt that Williams "shares a warm, genuine chemistry with his on-screen offspring Gellar," as part of a mixed critical response. The series was canceled after one season, but earned Gellar the People's Choice Award for Favorite Actress in a New Television Series.

Following the conclusion of The Crazy Ones and the death of Williams, Gellar took another sabbatical from screen acting, stating that she had "been working [her] entire life" and "needed that break" to focus on raising her children. During that period, she made an appearance as Cinderella in a March 2015 episode of Whitney Avalon's  YouTube channel series Princess Rap Battle, voiced a recurring character known as the Seventh Sister in the second season of the animated science fiction series Star Wars Rebels (2015–2016), and guest starred as herself in the series finale of The Big Bang Theory, which aired on May 16, 2019. Gellar was also attached to several television projects that ultimately were not picked up for production. These included a 2016 pilot for a series based on Cruel Intentions, in which she reprised her role of Kathryn Merteuil.

2020s
In 2021, Gellar voiced Teela in Kevin Smith's Masters of the Universe: Revelation, an animated series for Netflix. In 2022, she made her first film appearances in 13 years with brief roles in Clerks III and Do Revenge, released in theaters and on Netflix respectively, in the same week. Mark Donaldson of Screen Rant described them as "low-key return movies" for Gellar, noting Clerks 3 as "a nod" to having previously worked with Smith, and Do Revenge as a reassessment of Cruel Intentions for "modern audiences". At the 2022 San Diego Comic-Con, it was announced that Gellar would star in and act as an executive producer of the Paramount+ supernatural drama series Wolf Pack, which premiered on January 26, 2023.

Public image
Gellar has graced the covers of numerous magazines throughout her career. After her February 1998 appearance on Seventeen, the list went on to include Nylon, Marie Claire, Vogue, Glamour, Esquire, Allure, Cosmopolitan, FHM, Rolling Stone, and Elle, among others. In 1999, Gellar signed on to be the face of Maybelline—becoming the company's first celebrity spokeswoman since Lynda Carter in the late 1970s. In 2002, she was honored with a Woman of the Year Award by Glamour magazine, and her wax figure by Madame Tussauds, was unveiled as part of the "Trail of Vampires" exhibition.

Her work in Buffy and commercially successful films such as I Know What You Did Last Summer, Cruel Intentions and Scooby-Doo made Gellar a household name, as well as one of Hollywood's "It Girls" during the late 1990s and early 2000s. In 1998, she appeared on Entertainment Weeklys Top 12 Entertainers of the Year and the "Most Beautiful" list by People magazine. Between 2002 and 2008, she was featured on the annual Maxim "Hot 100" list. Wearing a black lace bra, she was on the cover of the December 2007 issue of Maxim and was named the 2009 Woman of the Year by the magazine. She was voted number 1 in FHMs edition of "100 Sexiest Women" of 1999, and was featured in its 2005 list. She had also been in the magazine's German, Dutch, South African, Danish and Romanian editions of the 100 Sexiest Women list every year from 1998 onwards. Topsocialite.com listed her as the 8th Sexiest woman of the 1990s.

Gellar was featured in Google's Top 10 Women Searches of 2002 and 2003, coming in at No. 8, and was included in UK Channel 4's 100 Greatest Sex Symbols in 2007, ranking at No. 16. Other appearances and listings include Entertainment Weeklys Top 100 TV Icons in 2007, Glamours 50 Best Dressed Women in the World in 2004 and 2005, and BuddyTV's 100 Sexiest Women of 2011.

Gellar has appeared in "Got Milk?" ads as well as in the Stone Temple Pilots music video "Sour Girl" and Marcy Playground's "Comin' Up From Behind". She was featured on the cover of Gotham and their main story in the March 2008 issue, in which she spoke about how her style has evolved since she passed 30. She said: "It sounds clichéd, but when women turn 30, they find themselves. You become more comfortable in your own skin. Last night on Letterman, I wore this skintight Herve Leger dress. Two years ago, three years ago? I would never have worn it."

Other endeavors
Philanthropy
Gellar has been an active advocate for various charities, including breast cancer research, Project Angel Food, Habitat for Humanity and CARE. Of her charitable pursuits, she said: "I started because my mother taught me a long time ago that even when you have nothing, there's ways to give back. And what you get in return for that is tenfold. But it was always hard because I couldn't do a lot. I couldn't do much more than just donate money when I was on [Buffy] because there wasn't time. And now that I have the time, it's amazing."

In 1999, Gellar went to the Dominican Republic to help Habitat for Humanity's project of building homes for the residents; she explained: "You actually get to do something, where you get to go and build these houses. I like working with things where you can directly affect someone in particular". With Project Angel Food, she delivered healthy meals to people infected with AIDS, and through the Make-A-Wish Foundation, she granted sick children's wishes of meeting her while working on Buffy. In 2007, Gellar was featured in Vaseline's "Skin Is Amazing" campaign, in which she agreed to auction nude-posed photos of herself on eBay to raise money for the Coalition of Skin Diseases, an organization which supports clinical research, fosters physician and patient education.

In 2011, Gellar joined "The Nestlé Share the Joy of Reading Program", which promotes reading to young children to encourage them to read during the summer break. The following year, she was presented with the Tom Mankiewicz Leadership Award during the Beastly Ball at the Los Angeles Zoo. The honor recognizes members of the entertainment community who have excelled in establishing meaningful and lasting programs that contribute to the welfare of the world's natural and civic environment. In 2014 and 2015, Gellar hosted two fundraisers for Mattel Children's Hospital UCLA.

Foodstirs
In October 2015, Gellar, along with entrepreneurs Galit Laibow and Greg Fleishman, co-founded Foodstirs, a startup food crafting brand selling via e-commerce and retail easy-to-make organic baking mixes and kits for families. By 2018, the brand's products were sold at 7,500 retailers nationwide, including Starbucks, Whole Foods, Walmart, WW and Amazon.

Cookbook
Gellar released a cookbook titled Stirring up Fun with Food on April 18, 2017. The book was co-authored by Gia Russo, and features numerous food crafting ideas.

Personal life

Gellar met her future husband, Freddie Prinze Jr., while they were filming the 1997 teen horror film I Know What You Did Last Summer, but the two did not begin dating until 2000. They were engaged in April 2001 and married in Mexico on September 1, 2002, in a ceremony officiated by Adam Shankman, a director and choreographer with whom Gellar had worked on Buffy the Vampire Slayer.

Prinze and Gellar have worked together several times, including when they played each other's respective love interests as Fred and Daphne in  Scooby-Doo and Scooby-Doo 2: Monsters Unleashed. In 2007, in honor of their fifth year of marriage, Gellar legally changed her name to Sarah Michelle Prinze.

Together, Gellar and Prinze have two children, a daughter born in 2009 and a son born in 2012. The family lives in Los Angeles.

On February 10, 2021, Gellar expressed support for her Buffy the Vampire Slayer co-star Charisma Carpenter after Carpenter made allegations of abuse against series creator Joss Whedon. She also stated, "While I am proud to have my name associated with Buffy Summers, I don't want to be forever associated with the name Joss Whedon." In an interview with The Hollywood Reporter'' published January 18, 2023, Gellar is quoted as saying, "I'll never tell my full story because I don’t get anything out of it."

Filmography

Film

Television

Other works

Awards and nominations

References

External links

 
 
 

1977 births
20th-century American actresses
21st-century American actresses
Actresses from Los Angeles
Actresses from New York City
American child actresses
American female taekwondo practitioners
American film actresses
American people of Jewish descent
American soap opera actresses
American television actresses
American video game actresses
American voice actresses
Columbia Grammar & Preparatory School alumni
Daytime Emmy Award for Outstanding Younger Actress in a Drama Series winners
Daytime Emmy Award winners
Fiorello H. LaGuardia High School alumni
Living people
People from the Upper East Side